The Rose Tattoo  is a three-act play written by Tennessee Williams in 1949 and 1950; after its Chicago premiere on December 29, 1950, he made further revisions to the play for its Broadway premiere on February 2, 1951, and its publication by New Directions the following month.  A film adaptation was released in 1955. The Rose Tattoo tells the story of an Italian-American widow in Mississippi who has withdrawn from the world after her husband's death and expects her daughter to do the same.

Productions

The original Broadway play starred Maureen Stapleton, Phyllis Love, and Eli Wallach. Other original cast members of the 1951 Broadway play included Martin Balsam and Vivian Nathan. The original production of The Rose Tattoo premiered February 3, 1951, at the Martin Beck Theatre (now known as the Al Hirschfeld Theatre) and concluded October 27, 1951, with a total of 306 performances. It was produced by Cheryl Crawford, written by Tennessee Williams; incidental music by David Diamond, staged by Daniel Mann, scenic design by Boris Aronson, costumes designed by Rose Bogadnoff, lighting designed by Charles Elson, general manager John Yorke, stage manager Ralph De Launey, conductor and harpist Nettie Druzinsky, musicians: Michael Danzi, Jack Linx and Frank Kutak, production associate Bea Lawrene, and press representative Wolfe Kauffman. The play was recreated for a July 5, 1953, hour-long radio adaptation on the program Best Plays.  Recordings of the radio drama exist in archives and private collections.

The play was revived in 1966, again starring Maureen Stapleton, with Maria Tucci replacing Phyllis Love in the role of Rose Delle Rose. Tucci was nominated for the Tony Award for Best Featured Actress in a Play for her performance. The revival ran from November 9 to December 31 at the Billy Rose Theatre (now known as the Nederlander Theatre) with 62 performances under the direction of Milton Katselas. Scenic design by David R. "Tex" Ballou, costume design by Frank Thompson, lighting designed by Peggy Clark, stage manager Ray Laine, and press representatives Arthur Cantor and Artie Solomon.

The second revival, starring Anthony LaPaglia and Mercedes Ruehl, took place in 1995 from March 23 to April 30, running for 73 performances at the Circle in the Square Theatre with casting by Stuart Howard and Amy Schecter under the direction of Robert Falls. Scenic design was by Santo Loquasto, costume design by Catherine Zuber, lighting design by Kenneth Posner, sound design by John Kilgore, hair and make-up design by Claus Lulla, wig design by John Aitchison, general manager Don Roe, management consultant Gordon G. Forbes, stage manager Peggy Peterson, assistant stage manager Wm. Hare, and dialect coach K. C. Ligon.

New Directions Publishing reissued the play in 2010 with a new introduction by playwright John Patrick Shanley.

A third Broadway revival starring Marisa Tomei and directed by Trip Cullman premiered at the American Airlines Theatre in previews on September 19, 2019, and officially on October 15.

Controversy
On May 12, 1957, the Pike Theatre in Dublin, Ireland, staged The Rose Tattoo with Anna Manahan as the lead and the Irish scenic artist Reginald Gray as the set designer. After a short run, the theatre was invaded by the Irish police and director Alan Simpson was arrested for producing "a lewd entertainment" for miming dropping a condom onto the floor. Williams' script calls for a condom to fall out of a pocket during the show but the Pike staging mimed the act, knowing it would cause conflict. An intellectual revolt against the closing of The Rose Tattoo came from not only Ireland but from the continent, led by playwrights Samuel Beckett, Seán O'Casey and Brendan Behan. Simpson was later released. The presiding judge, Justice O'Flynn, ruled: "I can only infer that by arresting the accused, the object would be achieved of closing down the play." One of the results of this case was that any charges brought against theatre would have to be proven before the show could be forced to close.

Cast

Film adaptation 

A film adaptation starring Anna Magnani was released in 1955. Magnani won an Academy Award for her performance.

Awards and nominations

1951 Original Broadway Production

1966 Broadway Revival

1995 Broadway Revival

2019 Broadway Revival

See also 
 History of Italians in Mississippi

References

External links 
 
 
 1953 Best Plays radio adaptation of original play at Internet Archive
Ralph Delauney papers related to Tennessee Williams's The Rose Tattoo from Special Collections, University of Delaware Library

1951 plays
Broadway plays
American plays adapted into films
Plays by Tennessee Williams
Plays set in Mississippi
Tony Award-winning plays
New Directions Publishing books